Duchess Marie of Mecklenburg-Strelitz (Victoria Marie Auguste Luise Antoinette Karoline Leopoldine; 8 May 1878 – 14 October 1948) was the eldest daughter of Adolf Friedrich V, Grand Duke of Mecklenburg-Strelitz and his wife Princess Elisabeth of Anhalt.

Early life
As a young woman of 19, Marie became pregnant by a palace servant in 1897. The servant, a married man named Hecht, was responsible for turning off the gas-lights in the bedrooms of the grand ducal children. Several of Marie's cousins, including the future King George V of the United Kingdom and William II, German Emperor, thought that Marie had been "hypnotised", while Queen Victoria of the United Kingdom thought that Marie "must have been drugged". Hecht was dismissed from service on the charge of stealing; his subsequent lawsuit against the grand ducal family made the details of the story public. The story made radical newspaper headlines in its day.

A daughter was born to Marie in 1898; she was raised under the protection of Marie's grandmother Augusta, Grand Duchess of Mecklenburg-Strelitz.

First marriage
Marie went to France, where she met Count George Jametel (1859–1944), the son of Ernest Jametel, a banker and patent medicine manufacturer, and nephew of the politician Count Gustave-Louis Jametel; he had received the Papal title of Count from Pope Leo XIII in 1886. The acquaintance proceeded at a brisk pace, and Marie and George were married on 22 June 1899, only one year after the birth of Marie's illegitimate child. The wedding was held at the Catholic Chapel of St. Elizabeth in Richmond Park, London, near White Lodge, the home of Marie's great-aunt the Duchess of Teck. A second, Anglican wedding ceremony was held the same day at the Parish Church of Kew. Even though the marriage was morganatic, many members of Marie's family attended the wedding, including her grandparents, parents, and three siblings. The wedding breakfast was given by her great-uncle the Duke of Cambridge at Cambridge Cottage, Kew.

Marie and George received a large financial settlement ($200,000) from Marie's father. They lived in the Faubourg St. Germain in Paris. They had two children:

 Count George Jametel (3 February 1904 – 1982)
 Countess Marie Auguste Jametel (11 September 1905 – 24 September 1969)

Marie's husband George had several affairs, most notoriously with the married Infanta Eulalia of Spain, daughter of Isabella II of Spain. In January 1908, Marie applied for a divorce from George. She accused the Count of having married her for her money, and of having continued his affair with Infanta Eulalia. When the matter went to court, Marie's own scandalous past, as the unwed mother of a manservant's child, was revealed and thrown in her face; as a result, Marie's family suffered much public disgrace. In August the same year, while the case was still proceeding in court, Marie's youngest brother, the nineteen-year-old Duke Karl Borwin of Mecklenburg, felt moved to challenge his brother-in-law to a duel, supposedly in defence of Marie's honour. The duel took place, and it was Borwin who was killed.  Marie and George were divorced 31 December 1908. Having lost her fortune due to the divorce, Marie resumed the use of her Mecklenburg title and lived in the Blasewitz section of Dresden.

Second marriage
On 11 August 1914, at Neustrelitz, Marie married Prince Julius Ernst of Lippe (1873–1952), third son of Count Ernst of Lippe-Biesterfeld, regent of Lippe, younger brother of Leopold IV, Prince of Lippe and uncle of Prince Bernhard of the Netherlands. 
 
After their marriage Marie and Julius lived in Blasewitz and they later moved to Lippesches Palais in Oberkassel near Bonn. 
They had two children:

 Princess Elisabeth of Lippe (23 January 1916 – 16 May 2013); married Prince Ernst-August of Solms-Braunfels (1892-1968)
 Prince Ernst August of Lippe (1 April 1917 – 15 June 1990); married Christa von Arnim (1923-2020); he was also a claimant to the headship of the House of Lippe.

Marie died at the age of seventy in Oberkassel, near Bonn. She is buried with her second husband in the Mausoleum am Büchenberg in Detmold, which is a Lippe family mausoleum.

Ancestry

Footnotes

Sources

External links
 Duchess Marie | House of Mecklenburg-Strelitz

1878 births
1948 deaths
House of Mecklenburg-Strelitz
House of Lippe
People from Neustrelitz
Duchesses of Mecklenburg-Strelitz
Princesses of Lippe
German people of English descent
Daughters of monarchs